The 1988–89 Sporting de Gijón season was the 28th season of the club in La Liga, the 14th consecutive after its last promotion.

Squad

Competitions

La Liga

Results by round

League table

Matches

Copa del Rey

Matches

Squad statistics

Appearances and goals

|}

References

External links
Profile at BDFutbol
Official website

Sporting de Gijón seasons
Sporting de Gijon